The 2015 ISU World Team Trophy is an international team figure skating competition that was held during the 2014–15 season. Participating countries selected two men's single skaters, two ladies' single skaters, one pair and one ice dancing entry to compete in a team format with points based on the skaters' placement.

Entries

Results

Team standings

Men

Ladies

Pairs

Ice dancing

References

External links
 Entries
 Starting Order / Results

ISU World Team Trophy In Figure Skating, 2015
ISU World Team Trophy in Figure Skating